John Denis Fraser (30 June 1934 – 6 April 2017) was a Labour Member of Parliament for Norwood in London from 1966 to 1997 and a solicitor.

Early life and education

Fraser was born on 30 June 1934 in Wandsworth, London, to Frances Benedict and Archibald Fraser. He was of Scottish and Irish descent.

He was educated at Sloane Grammar School, Chelsea and the Law Society College of Law, becoming a solicitor. He was a senior partner at the law firm Lewis Silkin LLP.

Political career
Fraser was a councillor on Lambeth Borough Council from 1962 to 1965 and the London Borough of Lambeth from 1964. He was a founding member of the Co-operative (Housing) Development Society.

He was Under Secretary at the Department of Trade and Industry in 1966, Under Secretary of State for Employment from 1974 to 1976, and Minister of State at the Department of Prices & Consumer Protection from 1976 to 1979. He was largely responsible for steering the Unfair Contract Terms Act of 1977 through Parliament.

Norwood was abolished as a constituency in 1997. Fraser lost the selection contest for Dulwich and West Norwood to Tessa Jowell, then MP for Dulwich.

Personal life

Fraser was a devout Catholic, and he often gave readings at church.  He married Ann Hathaway in 1960. Together they had three children: two sons and a daughter.

References 

http://www.lewissilkin.com/About-us/Our-History

1934 births
2017 deaths
Labour Party (UK) MPs for English constituencies
Councillors in Greater London
Councillors in the London Borough of Lambeth
UK MPs 1966–1970
UK MPs 1970–1974
UK MPs 1974
UK MPs 1974–1979
UK MPs 1979–1983
UK MPs 1983–1987
UK MPs 1987–1992
UK MPs 1992–1997
Members of Lambeth Metropolitan Borough Council